Patrik Žeňúch (born 30 December 1990) is a male javelin thrower from Slovakia. He competed in the Men's javelin throw event at the 2015 World Championships in Athletics in Beijing, China.

See also
 Slovakia at the 2015 World Championships in Athletics

References

Slovak male javelin throwers
Living people
Place of birth missing (living people)
1990 births
World Athletics Championships athletes for Slovakia
Athletes (track and field) at the 2015 European Games
European Games medalists in athletics
European Games silver medalists for Slovakia